The 1941 Notre Dame Fighting Irish football team was an American football team that represented the University of Notre Dame as an independent during the 1941 college football season. In its first season under head coach Frank Leahy, Notre Dame compiled an 8–0–1 record, outscored opponents by a total of 189 to 64, and was ranked No. 3 in the final AP Poll.

Tackle Paul Lillis was the team captain. Quarterback Angelo Bertelli led the team on offense and went on to win the Heisman Trophy in 1943. End Bob Dove was a consensus first-team player on the 1941 All-America team; he was later inducted into the College Football Hall of Fame. Guard Bernie Crimmins was also selected by Collier's and Liberty magazines as a first-team All-American.

Schedule

References

Notre Dame
Notre Dame Fighting Irish football seasons
College football undefeated seasons
Notre Dame Fighting Irish football